These are the results of the 1983 Ibero-American Championships in Athletics which took place from 23 to 25 September 1983 at Estadio Juan Serrahima in Barcelona, Spain.

Men's results

100 meters
Final – 23 September
Wind: +0.5 m/s

200 meters
Final – 25 September
Wind: +0.1 m/s

400 meters
Final – 25 September

800 meters
Final – 24 September

1500 meters
Final – 25 September

5000 meters
Final – 25 September

10,000 meters
Final – 24 September

Marathon
Final – 25 September

110 meters hurdles
Final – 25 September
Wind: +0.1 m/s

400 meters hurdles
Final – 24 September

3000 meters steeplechase
Final – 25 September

High jump
Final – 25 September

Pole vault
Final – 24 September

Long jump
Final – 25 September

Triple jump
Final – 23 September

Shot put
Final – 23 September

Discus throw
Final – 23 September

Hammer throw
Final – 24 September

Javelin throw
Final – 25 September

20 kilometers walk
Final – 24 September

4x100 meters relay
Final – 25 September

4x400 meters relay
Final – 25 September

Women's results

100 meters
Final – 23 September
Wind: +0.4 m/s

200 meters
Final – 25 September
Wind: +1.1 m/s

400 meters
Final – 25 September

800 meters
Final – 24 September

1500 meters
Final – 25 September

3000 meters
Final – 23 September

100 meters hurdles
Final – 24 September
Wind: +1.7 m/s

400 meters hurdles
Final – 24 September

High jump
Final – 24 September

Long jump
Final – 24 September

Shot put
Final – 24 September

Discus throw
Final – 25 September

Javelin throw
Final – 23 September

4x100 meters relay
Final – 25 September

4x400 meters relay
Final – 25 September

References

Ibero-American Championships
Events at the Ibero-American Championships in Athletics